Margarete Steinborn (1893–1957) was a German film editor.

Selected filmography
 A Night on the Danube (1935)
 The Unfaithful Eckehart (1940)
 Der Herr im Haus (1940)
 Alarm (1941)
 A Man for My Wife (1943)
 The Master Detective (1944)
 Free Land (1946)
 One Night Apart (1950)
 The Black Forest Girl (1950)
 Immortal Beloved (1951)
 At the Well in Front of the Gate (1952)
 Mikosch Comes In (1952)
 The Land of Smiles (1952)
 Josef the Chaste (1953)
 When The Village Music Plays on Sunday Nights (1953)
 The Gypsy Baron (1954)
 The Faithful Hussar (1954)
 The Happy Village (1955)
 The Beautiful Master (1956)

References

Bibliography
 Hans-Michael Bock & Michael Töteberg. Das Ufa-Buch. Zweitausendeins, 1992.

External links

1893 births
1957 deaths
German film editors
Film people from Berlin
German women film editors